Ken Okuyama (born 1959) is a Japanese industrial designer. He is the owner of the Ken Okuyama Design company. Okuyama formerly worked for Pininfarina, designing and supervising projects such as the Enzo Ferrari and Ferrari P4/5. His given name is  but goes by  outside Japan. He was born in the city of Yamagata, Japan, lives in Tokyo, and speaks Japanese, Italian, and English fluently.

Career
Okuyama graduated in 1986 from the Art Center College of Design in Pasadena, California. For the next three years he was a visiting professor at Tohoku University of Art and Design. In 1991, he returned to teach part-time at the Art Center College of Design. Between 2000 and 2004, he was Chair of the Transportation Design Department at the college, but in 2004 he was offered a job at Pininfarina.

Okuyama worked for General Motors and Porsche, helping design the new generation of the Porsche 911 (aka 996) as well as the Boxster. Before moving to Pininfarina, he worked for General Motors in the Advanced Concepts Center in California.

On 10 May 2004, Ken Okuyama began work as Creative Director at Pininfarina. He had been working with Pininfarina before, supervising the design of the Enzo Ferrari. As Creative Director Ken oversaw projects including the Ferrari 599 GTB Fiorano, Ferrari 456M GT, Ferrari California, Ferrari 612 Scaglietti, Chevrolet Camaro (fourth generation), Ferrari Rossa (Concept car), Mitsubishi Colt CZC, Maserati Birdcage 75th, Maserati Quattroporte V and Ferrari P4/5.

In 2006, Okuyama left Pininfarina and set up his own design firm, Newton Design Lab. In late 2007, Okuyama launched the Ken Okuyama Eyes collection, an eyewear collection manufactured in Japan.

In 2008, Ken Okuyama presented his first concept car under his own name, the K.O. 7 Spider, a carbon fiber reinforced polymer and unpainted aluminium two-seater. The K.O. 7 was unveiled at the Geneva Motor Show in March 2008. Ken Okuyama has cooperated with the luxury watch producer TAG Heuer, having fitted the TAG Heuer Grand Carrera at the dashboard of the car. The interior of the concept car was inspired by the design of the TAG Heuer watch.

In 2008, Ken Okuyama's design studio produced the first 20 models of the K.O. 7 Spider, already pre-sold to an "inner circle" of the designer's fans. It was followed by the production of 99 cars in 2009 and 99 more in 2010.

In 2016, Ken Okuyama revealed the Kode 57. This will be an additional member to the limited-edition family, as only five units will be produced. Forbes Magazine stated "Enzo Ferrari Designer Stuns Monterey With Breathtaking Kode 57 Supercar".

Projects

Railway vehicles

 JR East E6 Series Shinkansen, introduced in March 2013
 JR East E7 Series Shinkansen, introduced in March 2014
 Rebuilt KiHa 141 series coaches for the JR East SL Ginga excursion train, introduced on the Kamaishi Line in April 2014
 Revised colour scheme for JR East E3 Series Shinkansen fleet used on Tsubasa services from April 2014
 JR East E3 series Toreiyu excursion train, entering service on the Yamagata Shinkansen from July 2014
 E235 series commuter trains for the Yamanote Line in Tokyo
 JR East E353 series Super Azusa trains entering service in 2015
 HB-E300 series 4-car hybrid DMU set for use on Resort Shirakami - Buna services in the north of Japan from July 2016
 JR East E001 series Train Suite Shiki-shima luxury cruise train
 Tobu 500 series limited express trains entering service in spring 2017
 New trains for the Kobe Municipal Subway Seishin-Yamate Line, entering service in fiscal 2018
 Osaka Metro 400 series, entering service in April 2023
 JR East E8 Series Shinkansen, entering service in 2024

Cars

Honda NSX (first generation)
 Mitsubishi Colt CZC
 KEN OKUYAMA DESIGN・Kode7
 KEN OKUYAMA DESIGN・Kode7 clubman
 KEN OKUYAMA DESIGN・Kode7 SeriesII
 KEN OKUYAMA DESIGN・Kode8
 KEN OKUYAMA DESIGN・Kode9
 KEN OKUYAMA DESIGN・Kode9 Spyder
 KEN OKUYAMA DESIGN・Kode57 Enji
 KEN OKUYAMA DESIGN・Kode0
 Ferrari 456M GT
 Ferrari Rossa (Concept car)
 Ferrari Enzo
 Ferrari 612 Scaglietti
 Ferrari 599 GTB Fiorano
 Ferrari P4/5 (Concept car)
 Ferrari California
 Maserati Quattroporte V
 Maserati Birdcage 75th (Concept car)

Other Projects 

 OHCO M.8LE (limited edition) massage chair. 
 OHCO M.8 massage chair. 
 OHCO M.DX massage chair.  
 OHCO R.6 massage chair. 
Ken Okuyama designed the M-series and R-series massage chairs with a swing door in partnership with Furniture for Life (FFL).  FFL is Inc. 5000 company based in Boulder, Colorado.

  
 Gundam G40 (Industrial Design Ver.) (HG)

Awards
The following were awarded to either Ken Okuyama, car, or other project he worked with others to design:
The Pininfarina Metrocubo won The Best Interior Design of the Year Award in 1999
The Ferrari Rossa, designed by Okuyama, won The Best Concept Car of The Year award in 2000
The Maserati Birdcage 75th won the Best Concept prize at the Editors Choice Awards by Autoweek
The Maserati Birdcage 75th won the Louis Vuitton Classic Concept Award which Pininfarina gave to Okuyama
The prestigious Hall of Fame award “La Bella Macchina” was given to Ken Okuyama at Concorso Italiano on August 20, 2016.
2019 Consumer Electronics Show Innovation Honor awarded in the Fitness, Sports, and Biotech Category for the OHCO M.8
 2019 ePDA (European Product Design Award) for the OHCO M.8
 2019 Pinnacle Award in Furniture for the OHCO M.8
 2020 Good Design award for the OHCO M.8

References

External links

  
 Yamagata Koubou website
OHCO Massage Chairs website

1959 births
Art Center College of Design people
Japanese automobile designers
Japanese expatriates in Italy
Living people
People from Yamagata Prefecture
Pininfarina people
Ferrari people